Giorgio Bulgari (5 May 1890 - 6 March 1966) was an Italian businessman, son of Sotirios Bulgari, the founder of the luxury brand Bulgari.

Early life
Giorgio Bulgari was born on 5 May 1890, the second of three sons of Sotirios Bulgari (born Boulgaris) and his wife Elena.

Career
Giorgio and his elder brother Costantino Bulgari (born 1889) learned silversmithing and jewellery making from their father, which they took over on his death in 1932.

Personal life
He had three children; Gianni was born in 1935 and Paolo in 1937, and Nicola in 1941.

He died on 6 March 1966, and is buried in the Protestant Cemetery, Rome.

References

1890 births
1966 deaths
Businesspeople from Rome
Georgio
Italian businesspeople in fashion
Italian people of Greek descent
Italian people of Aromanian descent
Italian Protestants
Place of death missing
Burials in the Protestant Cemetery, Rome